People who have served as mayor of Rochester, Minnesota.

References

Mayors of Rochester, Minnesota. The Political Graveyard.
Alexander P. Smetka Minnesota State University Alumni Association.
STEARNS, Ozora Pierson infoplease.
Obit of Paul Grassle Rochester Post Bulletin/rootsweb.
Rear Platform Remarks in Minnesota and Wisconsin The Public Papers of Harry S. Truman.
Born in a Storm Mayo Clinic
Robert Olds of Windsor and Suffield, CT and his descendants Rootsweb/Dan W. Olds
Olmsted County History The Minnesota GenWeb Project/Olmsted County Genealogy
Rochester Police Department History City of Rochester, Minnesota
The History Center of Olmsted County
Images of America Rochester, MN by Ted St. Mane

Rochester, Minnesota